Lieutenant-Colonel Chanan Singh Dhillon (ca. 1920s–September 13, 2011) was a Punjabi Indian Sikh World War II hero and veteran.

Career
In 1940, at 20, he enlisted in the British Indian army, at a young age and was posted to, among other places, Lahore, Kabul. When WW2 broke out, his unit (Bengal Sappers) was moved to North Africa.

Following his capture between Mersa Matruh and El-Alamein on 29 June 1942 (Altaba airstrip), Chanan Singh Dhillon and over 300 other Indian prisoners were bundled onto an old freighter, SS Loreto, on 9 October and shipped to Italy across the Mediterranean to be interned at one of the POW camps there. However, the freighter would be tracked and sunk by the British U class submarine, HMS Unruffled. 

While at the Odine POW camp, near Naples in Italy, he made an unsuccessful attempt to escape via a tunnel.

Transported from an Italian POW camp to a Stalag (camp) near Frankfurt in Germany after a series of escapes and recaptures, he was repatriated after the war.

In Germany he remained confined to POW Camp, Stalag XIIA in Limburg near Frankfurt. In addition, the International Red Cross, Geneva who was responsible for the welfare of POWs, appointed him Chief Man of confidence]]. The camp was liberated by American forces in 1945 where first he was taken to Paris, then brought to London and then sent back to India.

He served the Bengal Sappers as a Junior Commissioned Officer till he was granted a commission in the Indian Army in 1960. Eighteen years after his capture, He rose to the rank of Lieutenant-Colonel in the Indian Army.

Retirement
in 1975 Dhillon retired, following his retirement, he became president of the Indian Ex-services League (Punjab and Chandigarh), in India.

He campaigned for the full recognition of the sacrifices and courage of the Indian-subcontinent, African and Caribbean origin soldiers who fought in WW2 for the allies and the British. The London Memorial Gates are recognition of this goal. On August 1, 2001, Queen Elizabeth laid the foundation of the memorial, and she inaugurated it the next year, on November 6, 2002.

Death
Lt. Col. Chanan Singh Dhillon died after a prolonged illness on 13 September 2011.

External links
Article on Lieutenant-Colonel Chanan Singh Dhillon

Indian Sikhs
Punjabi people
People from Punjab, India
Sikh warriors
2011 deaths
1920 births